Peter George Penny, 2nd Viscount Marchwood (1912–1979) was a British soldier, business man, and peer, a Conservative member of the House of Lords from 1979 to 1999.

The son of Frederick George Penny, 1st Viscount Marchwood, he was educated at Winchester College and then commissioned into the Royal Artillery as a 2nd Lieutenant, rising to the rank of major during the Second World War. He was later a director of George Wimpey and chairman and managing director of Vine Products.

On 1 February 1955, he succeeded his father as Viscount Marchwood, of Penang and of Marchwood, Hampshire (U.K., 1945), Baron Marchwood, of Penang and of Marchwood (U.K., 1937), and as a baronet. He sat in the House of Lords as a Conservative.

Marchwood married Pamela Colton-Fox, and they had three children:
David George Staveley Penny, later 3rd Viscount Marchwood (1936–2022)
Patrick Glyn Staveley Penny (1939–2010)
Carol Ann Penny (1948–1964) 

Marchwood died in 1979 and was succeeded in his peerages by his eldest son.

Notes

1912 births
1979 deaths
People educated at Winchester College
Royal Artillery officers
Viscounts in the Peerage of the United Kingdom